Lee Inglis (born August 31, 1947) is a Canadian former professional ice hockey player.

During the 1973–74 and 1974–75 seasons, Inglis played 10 games in the World Hockey Association with the New York Golden Blades/Jersey Knights, and San Diego Mariners.

References

External links

1947 births
Living people
Canadian ice hockey left wingers
Dayton Gems players
Kitchener Rangers players
New York Golden Blades players
San Diego Mariners players
Syracuse Blazers players
Toledo Blades players
Tucson Mavericks players